The 200 Juvenile Justice System Ordinance (XXII OF 2000) is an ordinance promulgated in Pakistan in 2000 to provide for protection of the rights of children involved in criminal litigation.

See also

 Borstal Institution and Juvenile Jail Bahawalpur
 Borstal Institution and Juvenile Jail Faisalabad

References

External links
 

Ordinance in Pakistan